Straight, Place and Show is a 1938 American comedy film directed by David Butler and starring the Ritz Brothers, Richard Arlen, and Ethel Merman, and released by 20th Century Fox. It based on the unproduced play Saratoga Chips by Damon Runyon and Irving Caesar. It features a performance of the song "With You on My Mind" by Merman.

Plot
Al, Jimmy and Harry get into a jam at the racetrack and expose a gang of cheating Russian jockeys.

Cast
 The Ritz Brothers as Themselves
 Ethel Merman as Linda Tyler
 Richard Arlen as Denny Paine
 Phyllis Brooks as Barbara Drake
 George Barbier as Mr. Drake

References

External links
 

1938 films
American black-and-white films
1938 comedy films
Films directed by David Butler
American comedy films
20th Century Fox films
1930s English-language films
1930s American films